Funambulus is a genus of rodents in the Sciuridae (squirrel) family, the only one in tribe Funambulini. It contains these species:
 Genus Funambulus
 Subgenus Funambulus
 Layard's palm squirrel (F. layardi)
 Dusky palm squirrel (F. obscurus)
 Indian palm squirrel (F. palmarum)
 Nilgiri striped palm squirrel (F. sublineatus)
 Jungle palm squirrel (F. tristriatus)
 Subgenus Prasadsciurus
 Northern palm squirrel (F. pennantii)

Etymology
"Funambulus" is the Latin word for "rope-dancer".

References

 
Rodent genera
Taxa named by René Lesson
Taxonomy articles created by Polbot